Søren Jensen may refer to:

 Søren Jensen (footballer) (born 1984), Danish footballer
 Søren Jensen (rower) (1919–1995), Danish rower
 Søren Jensen (sculptor) (born 1957), Danish sculptor
 Søren Alfred Jensen (1891–1978), Danish gymnast and Olympic medalist
 Søren Marinus Jensen (1879–1965), Danish wrestler and Olympic medalist
 Søren Jensen (handballer) (born 1942), Danish handball player and Olympic competitor
 Søren Elung Jensen (1928–2017), Danish film actor
 Søren Georg Jensen (1917–1982), Danish silversmith and sculptor